Fabricius  is a surname. Notable people with the surname include:

people from the Ancient Roman gens Fabricia:
Gaius Fabricius Luscinus, the first of the Fabricii to move to Rome
 Johann Goldsmid (1587–1616), known by his Latinized name Johann Fabricius, and son of David Fabricius (1564–1617). Astronomer who discovered the variability of the star Mira Ceti in 1596.
 Carel Fabritius (sometimes spelled Fabricius, 1622–1654), Dutch painter
 David Fabricius (1564–1617), German theologian and  astronomer, discoverer of the variable star Mira
 Ernst Fabricius (1857–1942), German historian, archaeologist and classical scholar
 Georg Fabricius (1516–1571), German poet, historian and archaeologist
 Hieronymus Fabricius or Girolamo Fabrizio (1537–1619), Italian anatomist
 Hildanus Fabricius (Wilhelm Fabry) (1560–1634), German anatomist and surgeon  
 Jan Fabricius (1871-1964), Dutch journalist and playwright
 Johan Fabricius (1899–1981),  Dutch writer, journalist and adventurer
 Johann Fabricius (1608-1653), German orientalist, professor of Hebrew at Rostock
 Johann Albert Fabricius (1668–1736), German classical scholar, publisher, and librarian
 Johann Phillip Fabricius (1711–1791), German Christian missionary in southern India
 Johan Christian Fabricius (1745–1808), Danish botanist and entomologist
 Johannes Fabricius, (1587–1615) Frisian astronomer, discoverer of sunspots, son of David Fabricius
 Nanna Øland Fabricius (1985–) Danish singer-songwriter, great-great-granddaughter of Otto Fabricius
 Otto Fabricius (1744–1822) Danish missionary, naturalist, ethnographer and explorer of Greenland
 Philipp Conrad Fabricius (1714–1774), German botanist
 Werner Fabricius, German composer, father of Johann Albert Fabricius
 Wilhelm Fabricius, German ambassador to Romania under Hitler
 Alexander Carpenter, Latinized Fabricius, (fl. 1429), English religious philosopher and author
 B. Fabricius, pseudonym of Heinrich Theodor Dittrich, German philologist and librarian

See also
 Fabricius (crater), a lunar impact crater in the northeast part of the walled plain Janssen
 Fabrizio (disambiguation)
 Fabritius (disambiguation)

Latin-language surnames
German-language surnames